This is a list of the longest winning streaks in National Football League (NFL) history. The list includes streaks that started at the end of one season and carried over into the following season. There are two lists, streaks that consist entirely of regular-season games and streaks made up of playoff games only. The Indianapolis Colts hold the record for the longest regular season winning streak in NFL history. They won 9 straight games to finish the 2008 season and started the 2009 season with 14 straight wins, compiling a total of 23 consecutive regular season wins. The New England Patriots hold the record for the longest postseason winning streak in NFL history, with 10 straight playoff wins between 2001 and 2005—although the team did miss the playoffs in 2002.

Key

Streaks

Regular season
This list contains only the top streaks consisting entirely of regular-season games.

Playoffs
This list contains only streaks consisting entirely of postseason games.

See also

List of National Football League longest losing streaks
List of NFL franchise post-season streaks
List of National Football League records (team)

References
 Pro-Football-Reference.com list of longest regular season winning streaks
 Pro-Football-Reference.com list of longest postseason winning streaks

National Football League lists
National Football League records and achievements